Fulbourn Manor is a Grade II listed building in the county of Cambridgeshire and the sole surviving manor of the Five Manors of Fulbourn.

History 
It was built in 1788  or maybe earlier.  An account from 1495 states that Richard Berkeley and his wife Anne Berkeley settled a debt of 1,000 marks with four manors of Fulbourn, which were stated as Zouches, Manners, Shardelowes and Fulbourn.

It was largely rebuilt around 1910 by Dudley Newman.  Reconstruction preserved part of the 18th century building.

References 

Country houses in Cambridgeshire
Manor